The following is a list of notable events and releases that happened in 2002 in music in South Korea.

Debuting and disbanded in 2002

Debuting groups

Black Beat
F-iV
Isak N Jiyeon
J-Walk
Leessang
Loveholics
LUV
MC the Max
Shinvi
Sugar
Sweet Sorrow
Vibe

Solo debuts
Byul
Chae Ri-na
Chu Ga-yeoul
MC Sniper
Rain
Ra.D
Shim Mina
Wheesung

Disbanded groups
KISS
S.E.S
S#arp
T.T.Ma

Releases in 2002

January

February

March

April

May

June

July

August

September

October

November

December

See also
2002 in South Korea
List of South Korean films of 2002

References

 
South Korean music
K-pop